The Kings Park Stadium (known as the Hollywoodbets Kings Park for sponsorship reasons since 2022), is a stadium located in the Kings Park Sporting Precinct in Durban, South Africa.

The stadium was originally built with a capacity of 12,000 and opened in 1958, extensively renovated in the 1980s and then again in time for the 1995 Rugby World Cup. The stadium has also been used by Durban-based Premier Soccer League football (soccer) clubs, as well as for large football finals.

It was previously also known as the ABSA Stadium (between 2000 and 2010), Mr Price Kings Park Stadium (in 2011 and 2012), Growthpoint Kings Park (between 2013 and early 2017), and Jonsson Kings Park (between 2018-2021) due to sponsorship deals.

1995 Rugby World Cup
The stadium was used as one of the venues for the 1995 Rugby World Cup held in South Africa. The stadium hosted three pool games in Pool B. The stadium also hosted one quarter final with France defeating Ireland 36–12. A very wet semi final was played here on 17 June 1995 between South Africa and France.

1996 African Cup of Nations
The stadium was one of four venues for the 1996 African Cup of Nations. It hosted 3 group matches, a quarter final and semi final.

Other events

Future
With the construction of the new Moses Mabhida Stadium for the 2010 FIFA World Cup less than 200m away, the local government had hoped that the Sharks would have relocated.  However, this is unlikely as they have a 50-year lease on Kings Park which runs to 2056.

References

Sports venues in Durban
Soccer venues in South Africa
Multi-purpose stadiums in South Africa
Rugby union stadiums in South Africa
Rugby World Cup stadiums
1891 establishments in the Colony of Natal
World Rugby Sevens Series venues